The Timočani (also Timochani, or Timochans; Serbian and Bulgarian: Тимочани) were a medieval South Slavic tribe that lived in the territory of present-day eastern Serbia, west of the Timok River, as well as in the regions of Banat, Syrmia and Moesia Superior.

Timočani settled in the Balkans in the 6-7th century in the former Dacia Ripensis province and became later subjects of the Avar Khaganate. It is considered that with the arrival of the Bulgars in the 7th century came under Bulgarian suzerainty, but for a good period of time between the mid-8th and early 9th century local Slavs lived in anarchy until around 805 when the area was reconquered and reimposed control of the Bulgar Khanate under Khan Krum. In the beginning of the 9th century they were also attacked from the West by the Serbs.

In 818 during the rule of Omurtag of Bulgaria (814-836) they, together with other border tribes of the First Bulgarian Empire, revolted because of an administrative reform of centralization that deprived them of much of their local authority. They left the Bulgarian society (association, alliance), and together with other Slavic tribes, searched protection from Holy Roman Emperor Louis the Pious in the same year, meeting him at his court at Herstal. However, they also joined the rebellion of Lower Pannonian Duke Ljudevit against the Franks. Many Timochans fled to Transdanubia, later becoming part of the Lower Pannonian Principality. Omurtag decided to settle the matter by means of diplomacy in 824-826, though his letters were not replied to by Louis. This prompted Omurtag to undertake a boat campaign on the Drava in 827 and invade the lands of the Timočani at Sirmium, successfully imposing Bulgar rule again and appointing local governors.

Their name derives from the Timok River. Today, "Timočani" can be used as an informal name for the inhabitants of the Timok Valley in Serbia and Bulgaria.

See also
List of Medieval Slavic tribes

References

Slavic tribes in Thrace and Moesia
First Bulgarian Empire
9th century in Serbia